Emilie Aubry (born 16 February 1989) is a Swiss professional racing cyclist. Emilie currently rides for United Kingdom based . She won the Swiss National Championships 2010.

Career highlights

2008
1st, GP Oberbaselbiet (SWI)
3rd, Road Race National Championships (SWI)

2009 – Cervélo TestTeam 2009 season

2010
1st in  Road Race National Championships

References

External links
 https://web.archive.org/web/20100813202112/http://www.cervelo.com/en_us/testteam/riders/view/emilie-aubry/28/?team=women

1989 births
Living people
Swiss female cyclists